Rudolph Berking-Williams (born August 30, 1978) is a Samoan sprint canoer.

He represented Samoa at the 2008 Summer Olympics in Beijing in the K-1 500 m and K-1 1000 m events.   

At the 2012 Summer Olympics he competed in the C-1 1000 m and C-1 200 m events.

At the 2020 Summer Olympics, he competed in the Men's K-1 200 m, Men's C-1 1000 m, and Men's K-2 1000 m

Career 
He is of German and Samoan descent and currently lives in Auckland, New Zealand.

He also competed at the 2007 World Championships..

References

External links
 
Biography on the official website of the Beijing Olympics
"Inspirational Williams local role model", Samoa Observer
"TV Interview with Rudolph Berking-Williams and Family", ''TVNZ On Demand- Tagata Pasifika'
"Samoa's Berking-Williams into K-1 1000 semis", Radio Australia'
"Aunese & Rudolf Did Their Best But Not Enough For Beijing", Samoa Live News'
Sports-Reference.com profile

1978 births
Canoeists at the 2008 Summer Olympics
Canoeists at the 2012 Summer Olympics
Canoeists at the 2020 Summer Olympics
Living people
Olympic canoeists of Samoa
Samoan male canoeists